Delmas may refer to:

People
 Antoine Guillaume Delmas (1766–1813), French revolutionary and Napoleonic general
 Benjamin Delmas (born 1976), French ice dancer
 Bert Delmas (Albert Charles Delmas, 1911–1979), American baseball player 
 Calixte Delmas (1906–1927), French wrestler and rugby player
 François Delmas (1913–2002), French politician
 Jean-François Delmas (bass-baritone) (1861–1933), or Francisque Delmas, French opera singer
 Jean-François Delmas (palaeographer) (born 1964), French palaeographer and librarian
 Jean-François-Bertrand Delmas (1751–1798), French revolutionary politician
 Jean-Jacques Delmas (1938–2010), French physician
 Louis Delmas (born 1987), American footballer
 Robert Delmas (born 1955), French aeronautical engineer, after whom 11147 Delmas is named
 Marc Delmas (1885–1931), French expressionist composer and writer
 Serge Delmas (born 1947), French footballer 
 Sophie Delmas (fl. from 1996), French actress and singer
 Victor Delmas (born 1991), French rugby player
 Julián Delmás (born 1995), Spanish footballer 
 Miloš Đelmaš (born 1960), Serbian footballer
 Raša Đelmaš (1950–2021), Serbian rock musician
 Delmas Del Ballard Jr. (born 1963), American bowler
 Delmas Del Hodgkinson (born 1939), English former rugby league footballer

Places
 Delmas, Saskatchewan, Canada
 Delmas, Ouest, Haiti
 Delmas, Mpumalanga, South Africa

Other uses
 Delmas (shipping company), a Europe-Africa shipping and transportation firm
 Elisabeth Delmas and Jean-Pierre Delmas, fictional characters from Code Lyoko

See also

 Delma, a genus of lizards 
 Nicole Delma, American reality show contestant
 Delmas Treason Trial, the 1986 prosecution of 22 South African anti-apartheid activists